Do You See What I See? is Todd Agnew's third label release, which tells the story of the birth of Jesus from the perspective of characters involved in the Christmas story. Todd enlisted the help of fellow Christian artists to sing for characters on the album.

Track listing 
"Prelude: Do You Hear What I Hear?" Performed by Todd Agnew (Gloria Shayne, Noel Regney) – 4:54
"No Room (Innkeeper's Song)" Performed by Joy Whitlock and Todd Agnew (Todd Agnew, Lewis Redner) – 4:59
"This Is All I Have to Give (Joseph's Song)" Performed by Vince Lichlyter of Jonah33 (Agnew) – 4:48
"Magnificat (Mary's Song)" - Performed by Christy Nockels of Watermark (Agnew) – 5:00
"Did You Know? (Song To Infant Christ)" Performed by Todd Agnew (Agnew) – 4:33
"Sleep Well (Elizabeth To John The Baptist)" Performed by Shelley Jennings (Agnew) – 4:35
"He Is Called Jesus (Simeon's Song)" Performed by Mike Weaver of Big Daddy Weave (Agnew, Michael Card) – 4:41
"God With Us (Wise Men Song)"  Performed by Todd Agnew (Agnew) – 5:16
"Glory To God (Angels' Song)" Performed by Anthony Evans (Agnew, John Francis Wade) – 4:57
"Bethlehem Dawn (Shepherd's Song)" Performed by Michael O'Brien (Agnew, Franz Xaver Gruber) – 4:41
"Postlude: In The First Light" Performed by Todd Agnew, Shelley Jennings, Christy Nockels, Michael O'Brien and Mike Weaver (Shayne, Regney) – 4:51

Awards 

In 2007, the album was nominated for a Dove Award for Christmas Album of the Year at the 38th GMA Dove Awards.

Production 
 Todd Agnew – producer
 Don Marsh – orchestra and chorus producer
 Curry Weber – engineer, mix assistant, lead vocal engineer (2)
 Pete Matthews – lead vocal engineer (3)
 Nathan Nockels – lead vocal engineer (4)
 Brent Milligan – lead vocal engineer (6), vocal engineer (7)
 Jeff Cain – lead vocal engineer (9)
 Nathan Zwald – lead vocal engineer (10)
 Steve Dady – orchestra and chorus engineer
 Jason Gillespie – additional engineering
 Adam Hill – additional engineering
 John Hampton – mixing
 Kevin Nix – mastering
 Disciple Design – design, layout 
 Ben Pearson – Todd Agnew photography 
 Gary Walpole – nativity photos
 VanLiere-Wilcox – management 
 Recorded and Mixed at Ardent Studios (Memphis, TN)
 Orchestra and Chorus recorded at Sunset Blvd. Studios (Brentwood, TN).
 Guest vocals recorded at Sunset Blvd. Studios (Brentwood, TN); Platinum Studios and Soundwerks (Nashville, TN); First Avenue Sound (Franklin, TN); Berwick Lane (Atlanta, GA).
 Mastered at L. Nix & Co., Inc. (Memphis, TN).

Musicians 
 Jeff Roach – pianos
 Rick Steff – Hammond B3 organ (2, 3)
 Tim Mason – Hammond B3 organ (9)
 Todd Agnew – acoustic guitar 
 Paul Moak – electric guitar (1, 3, 4, 5, 7, 10, 11)
 Steve Selvidge – electric guitar (2, 3, 7)
 Ted Partin – bass (1-4, 6-11)
 Gabe Ruschival – bass (5)
 Kim Trammell – drums (1-4, 6-11)
 Jeremy Lutito – drums (5)
 John Hampton – percussion (1, 2, 5-10)
 Brian Wilson – percussion (3, 4, 11)
 Elizabeth Montgomery – percussion (11)
 Jim Spake – clarinet solo (2)
 Jonathan Chu – violin solo (4)
 Don Marsh – orchestra and chorus arrangements 
 Carl Gorodetzky – orchestra contractor 
 The Nashville String Machine – orchestra
 Lisa Cochran, Rod Fletcher, Stephanie Hall, Marabeth Jordan, Shane McConnell and Terry White – chorus
 Darrel Petties and Strength In Praise - gospel choir (9)

References

External links
Listen to full length songs, Do You Hear and Magnificat
Press Release (Microsoft Word document)
Review at The Trades
Review at Christian Music Central
Review at Buddy Hollywood

2006 albums
Todd Agnew albums
Ardent Records albums